In the Philippines, regions (ISO 3166-2:PH) are administrative divisions that primarily serve to coordinate planning and organize national government services across multiple local government units (LGUs). Most national government offices provide services through their regional branches instead of having direct provincial or city offices. Regional offices are usually but not necessarily located in the city designated as the regional center.

As of 2019, the Philippines is divided into 17 regions. 16 of these are mere administrative groupings, each provided by the president of the Philippines with a regional development council (RDC) – in the case of the National Capital Region (Metro Manila), an additional metropolitan authority serves as the coordinating and policy-making body. Only one, the Bangsamoro Autonomous Region in Muslim Mindanao, has an elected government and parliament to which the Congress of the Philippines has delegated certain powers and responsibilities.

History 
Regions first came to existence on September 24, 1972, when the provinces of the Philippines were organized into eleven regions under Presidential Decree No. 1 as part of the Integrated Reorganization Plan of the former President Ferdinand Marcos.

Since that time, other regions have been created and some provinces have been transferred from one region to another.

 June 22, 1973: Pangasinan was transferred from Region III to Region I.
 July 7, 1975: Region XII created and minor reorganization of some Mindanao regions.
 July 25, 1975: Regions IX and XII declared as Autonomous Regions in Western and Central Mindanao respectively.
 August 21, 1975: Region IX divided into Sub-Region IX-A and Sub-Region IX-B. Minor reorganization of some Mindanao regions.
 November 7, 1975: Metropolitan Manila created.
 June 2, 1978: Metropolitan Manila declared as the National Capital Region.
 June 11, 1978: Regional center of Region IX transferred from Jolo, Sulu to Zamboanga City.
 July 15, 1987: Cordillera Administrative Region created.
 August 1, 1989: Autonomous Region in Muslim Mindanao (ARMM) created. Region XII reverted to an administrative region.
 October 23, 1989: First creation of Cordillera Autonomous Region. Ratification rejected by residents in a plebiscite.
 October 12, 1990: Executive Order 429 issued by President Corazon Aquino to reorganize the Mindanao regions but the reorganization never happened (possibly due to lack of government funds).
 February 23, 1995: Region XIII (Caraga) created and minor reorganization of some Mindanao regions. Sultan Kudarat transferred to Region XII.
 1997: Minor reorganization of some Mindanao regions.
 December 22, 1997: Second creation of Cordillera Autonomous Region. Ratification rejected by residents in a plebiscite.
 December 18, 1998: Sultan Kudarat returned to Region XII.
 March 31, 2001: ARMM expanded.
 September 19, 2001: Most Mindanao regions reorganized and some renamed.
 May 17, 2002: Region IV-A (Calabarzon) and Region IV-B (Mimaropa) created from the former Region IV (Southern Tagalog) region. Aurora transferred to Region III.
 May 23, 2005: Palawan transferred from Region IV-B to Region VI; Mimaropa renamed to Mimaro.
 August 19, 2005: Transfer of Palawan to Region VI held in abeyance.
 May 29, 2015: Negros Island Region (NIR) created. Negros Occidental and Bacolod from Region VI and Negros Oriental from Region VII transferred to form new region.
 July 17, 2016: Republic Act No. 10879 established the Southwestern Tagalog Region (Mimaropa Region) from the former Region IV-B (in effect merely a renaming and discontinuation of the "Region IV-B" designation since no boundary changes were involved).
 August 9, 2017:  Executive Order No. 38 was signed by President Rodrigo Duterte abolishing the Negros Island Region.
 January 25, 2019: Bangsamoro Autonomous Region in Muslim Mindanao (BARMM) created replacing the Autonomous Region in Muslim Mindanao (ARMM) after the Republic Act No. 11054 or the Bangsamoro Organic Law was "deemed ratified" on January 25, 2019, following the January 21 plebiscite.

List of regions 
, the Philippines is divided into 17 regions. The traditional island groups of Luzon, the Visayas, and Mindanao are composed of eight (Regions I, II, III, IV-A, and V, and CAR, NCR, and Mimaropa), three (VI, VII, and VIII), and six (IX, X, XI, XII, XIII, and BARMM) regions, respectively. The names of Calabarzon, Mimaropa, and Soccsksargen are acronyms signifying their component provinces and cities; and are usually capitalized in official government documents.

Types of regions

Administrative region 
An administrative region is a grouping of geographically adjacent LGUs that may be established, disestablished, and modified by the President of the Philippines based on the need to formulate coherent economic development policies, more efficiently provide national government services, and coordinate activities beneficial to the development of larger area beyond the province level. No plebiscites have been conducted so far to democratically confirm the creation, abolition or alteration of the boundaries of regular administrative regions, as the Constitution does not mandate it.

An administrative region is not a local government unit (LGU), but rather a group of LGUs to which the President has provided an unelected policy-making and coordinating structure, called the Regional Development Council (RDC). Metro Manila is recognized in law as a "special development and administrative region", and was thus given the Metropolitan Manila Development Authority (MMDA); the Metro Manila Council within the MMDA serves as the National Capital Region's RDC.

Autonomous region 

The 1987 Constitution allows for the creation of autonomous regions in the Cordillera Central of Luzon and the Muslim-majority areas of Mindanao. However, only the Bangsamoro Autonomous Region in Muslim Mindanao and its predecessor, the Autonomous Region in Muslim Mindanao, have been approved by voters in plebiscites held in 1989, 2001, and 2019. Voters in the Cordilleras rejected autonomy in 1990 and 1998; hence the Cordillera Administrative Region remains as a regular administrative region with no delegated powers or responsibilities.
 
The Supreme Court has ruled that an autonomous region established by statute must be composed of more than one province, thereby invalidating the proposed establishment of the Autonomous Region of Ifugao following the results of the original 1990 Cordillera autonomy plebiscite, which saw only Ifugao's voters casting a majority 'yes' vote towards autonomy.

Table of regions 
 Component local government units: the data column is limited to primary LGUs, which pertains to component provinces, highly urbanized cities, and independent component cities, as well as the independent municipality of Pateros. All city names, except those under the National Capital Region, are italicized.
 Location: the location map column can be sorted from north-to-south, west-to-east.

Judicial regions 

As far as the judiciary is concerned, specifically the first and second level courts, the country is divided into judicial regions as provided by Batas Pambansa Bilang 129. The coverage of these judicial regions generally coincides with that of the administrative regions in 1980, with some exceptions.

Legislative districts 
Representation for the Interim Batasang Pambansa was mostly through parliamentary districts based on how regions were organized in 1978. Metro Manila was "Region IV", while Southern Tagalog was "Region IV-A". This was the only time the national legislature was represented via regions; in a 1984 plebiscite, voters approved a constitutional amendment that reverted to representation per province and city.

Proposed regions 
 Cordillera Autonomous Region (proposal to convert the Cordillera Administrative Region into an autonomous region; see Cordillera autonomy movement)
 Negros Island Region (proposed reestablishment of an abolished region)
 Samar Administrative Region
 Bangsa Sug (proposed to separate the Sulu Archipelago from the mainland portion of Bangsamoro)

Defunct regions 
The following are regions that no longer exist, listed along with their current status:
 Southern Tagalog (Region IV, now divided into Calabarzon, Central Luzon (Aurora), Metro Manila (several cities that were part of Rizal), and Mimaropa; the name remains as a cultural-geographic region only)
 Western Mindanao (renamed as Zamboanga Peninsula, still designated as Region IX)
 Central Mindanao (now mostly Soccsksargen, still designated as Region XII)
 Southern Mindanao (now mostly Davao Region, still designated as Region XI)
 Negros Island Region (designated as Region XVIII/NIR; abolished; provinces were reverted and split to Western Visayas and Central Visayas)
 Autonomous Region in Muslim Mindanao (replaced by Bangsamoro)

See also 
 List of regions of the Philippines by GDP
 Super regions of the Philippines
 Federalism in the Philippines
 ISO 3166-2:PH

References

External links 

 National Statistical Coordination Board
 Philippine Statistics Authority

 
Subdivisions of the Philippines
Regions
Philippines 1
Philippines geography-related lists
Establishments by Philippine presidential decree